The following is a timeline of the presidency of Donald Trump during the fourth and last quarter of 2017, from October 1 to December 31, 2017. To navigate between quarters, see timeline of the Donald Trump presidency.

Overview

Economy

In the final quarter of 2017, the real U.S. gross domestic product (GDP) increased at an annual rate of 2.9%. The growth rate was primarily due to positive contributions from personal consumption expenditures (PCE), nonresidential fixed investment, exports, residential fixed investment, state and local government spending, and federal government spending.

Public opinion

According to Five Thirty-Eight, President Trump's average public approval rating on December 31, 2017, stood at 37.9%, representing a quarterly decline of 0.7 percentage points, and a decline of 7.6 percentage points since his inauguration on January 20, 2017.

Timeline

October 2017

November 2017

December 2017

See also
 Presidential transition of Donald Trump
 First 100 days of Donald Trump's presidency
 List of executive actions by Donald Trump
 List of presidential trips made by Donald Trump (international trips)

References

2017 Q4
2017 Q4
Presidency of Donald Trump
October 2017 events in the United States
November 2017 events in the United States
December 2017 events in the United States
Articles containing video clips